A Nature Conservation Review is a two-volume work by Derek Ratcliffe, published by Cambridge University Press in 1977. It set out to identify the most important places for nature conservation in Great Britain. It is often known by the initials NCR, and sites listed in it are termed "NCR sites".

The approach adopted by Ratcliffe was adapted and applied to the selection of sites important for geological conservation in the Geological Conservation Review. A Marine Nature Conservation Review has also been published.

Volume 1 set out the rationale and methods used, and gave descriptions of the major habitat types.

Volume 2 consisted entirely of a site inventory. Sites were grouped into six major habitat types:
 Coastal sites - 135 sites
 Woodlands - 234 sites
 Lowland grasslands, heaths and scrub - 159 sites
 Open waters - 99 sites
 Peatlands - 116 sites
 Upland grasslands and heaths - 101 sites

See also
 List of NCR sites

References

Environmental non-fiction books
Environment of the United Kingdom
1977 non-fiction books
1977 in the environment
Cambridge University Press books